A. J. Hazeltine House, also known as the Honorable Charles Warren Stone Museum, is a historic home located at Warren, Warren County, Pennsylvania.  It was built in 1905–1907, and is a three-story, buff brick dwelling in the Jacobean style.  It features marble lintels and capstones and wide terraces on two sides of the house. Its builder, A. J. Hazeltine, was a business associate of Congressman Charles Warren Stone (1843-1912). The American Legion occupied the house starting in 1928.  It was acquired by the county for the Warren County Historical Society in 1975.

It was added to the National Register of Historic Places in 1976.

References

Houses on the National Register of Historic Places in Pennsylvania
Jacobean architecture in Pennsylvania
Houses completed in 1907
Houses in Warren County, Pennsylvania
National Register of Historic Places in Warren County, Pennsylvania
Buildings and structures in Warren, Pennsylvania